National Recording Corporation was an American record label, established in Atlanta in 1958.

See also 
 List of record labels
 National Recording Corporation artists

References

Companies based in Atlanta
American record labels
Record labels established in 1958
1958 establishments in Georgia (U.S. state)